Matis Perchaud (born 17 September 2002) is a French rugby union player, who plays for Aviron Bayonnais.

Biograph 
Matis Perchaud grew up in Mouguerre, where he first played rugby, before joining the Aviron Bayonnais in 2017.

He made his debut with the first team during the 2020–21 season, playing his first games in Top 14 and even starting as a loosehead prop for a league game against Brive in February 2021. Soon after he signed a professional contrat, tying him to the club until 2024.

He really became a regular starter in Pro D2 with Bayonne the following season, as they won direct promotion back in the Top 14. In 2022, he was also a standout player with France under-20s as they finished second in the Six Nations, only narrowly losing against the Irish grand slam winners.

Following this breakout season, he was first called to the France senior team in June 2022 for the summer tour of Japan.

References

External links
 

2002 births
Sportspeople from Bayonne
Living people
French rugby union players
Rugby union props
Aviron Bayonnais players